SCAT Airlines Flight 760 was a scheduled domestic passenger flight from Kokshetau to Almaty, Kazakhstan, operated by a Bombardier CRJ200 twinjet that on 29 January 2013 crashed in thick fog near the village of Kyzyltu, while on approach to Almaty. All 16 passengers and five crew on board were killed.

The subsequent investigation determined that the aircraft had descended abruptly after pitching nose-down, but was unable to establish the cause of the sudden manoeuvre.

Aircraft and crew 

The aircraft was a 12-year-old Bombardier CRJ200 (registration UP-CJ006), which began flying in 2000 for Cimber Air with registration as OY-RJA. Nine years later, the aircraft was transferred to Cimber Sterling. Following Ciber Sterling's bankruptcy in 2012, SCAT Airlines purchased the aircraft, where it was reregistered as UP-CJ006. The aircraft was powered by two General Electric CF34-3B1 turbofan engines.

The captain was 55-year-old Vladimir Nikolaevich Evdokimov, who had been working for SCAT airlines since 2001 and had logged 18,194 flight hours, including 1,227 hours on the CRJ200. The first officer was 43-year-old Alexander Vladimirovich Sharapov, who had been with the airline since 2006 and had 3,507 flight hours, with 132 of them on the CRJ200.

Accident
The airliner operating the flight was on final approach to Almaty International Airport in thick fog when it crashed  short of the runway near the village of Kyzyltu at 13:13 local time (07:13 UTC), 14 seconds after initiating a go-around. All 16 passengers and five crew members aboard were killed.

Investigation
Shortly after the accident, a commission headed by Bakytzhan Sagintayev, the first deputy prime minister of Kazakhstan, was set up by Prime Minister Serik Akhmetov to investigate the cause of the crash.

Maulen Mukashev, the deputy mayor of Almaty, visited the crash site and told reporters that the preliminary cause of the crash was bad weather. Mukashev also added: "Not a single part of the plane was left intact after it came down."

On 2 March 2015, the Interstate Aviation Committee (IAC) released their final report, stating that during the missed approach procedure, initiated due to weather conditions being below minimal, a nose-down elevator deflection was recorded, resulting in a steep dive and impact with the ground. The investigation was unable to determine the cause of the elevator deflection, but did not find evidence of any system malfunction or external factors. 

However, the IAC's final report did state a possible scenario that could have led to the elevator deflection; Captain Evdokimov (who was the pilot flying) may have experienced a heart attack during the go-around (the final report noted that a postaccident autopsy on Evdokimov revealed that he had coronary artery disease), becoming incapacitated and collapsing onto the yoke, pushing the aircraft's nose down. The scenario also stated that First Officer Sharapov was focusing on radio communications during the upset until the enhanced ground proximity warning system activated.

See also
 2012 Kazakhstan Antonov An-72 crash

References

External links
 "Пресс-релиз [Press release]." SCAT Airlines  (Archive)
Interstate Aviation Committee 
"CRJ-200 UP-CJ006 29.01.2013."
"29 января CRJ-200 UP-CJ006."  (Archive)

2013 disasters in Kazakhstan
Accidents and incidents involving the Bombardier CRJ200
Aviation accidents and incidents in Kazakhstan
Aviation accidents and incidents in 2013
January 2013 events in Asia